Tioga Central School District is a school district headquartered in Tioga Center, New York. School colors are Blue & Gold. The school mascot is a tiger.

Schools
 Tioga Central High School
 Tioga Middle School
 Tioga Elementary School

References

External links
 
School districts in New York (state)
Education in Tioga County, New York